Margot A. Thien (born December 29, 1971 in San Diego, California) is an American competitor in synchronized swimming and Olympic champion.

She was part of the American team that received a gold medal in synchronized swimming at the 1996 Summer Olympics in Atlanta.

References

1971 births
Living people
American synchronized swimmers
Synchronized swimmers at the 1996 Summer Olympics
Olympic gold medalists for the United States in synchronized swimming
Olympic medalists in synchronized swimming
Medalists at the 1996 Summer Olympics
World Aquatics Championships medalists in synchronised swimming